Sanjeev Jaiswal (born 18 February 1988) is an Indian actor. Jaiswal has acted in two Hindi films, a drama and an action thriller. His first movie was Shaitan in which he played a small role of a police informer, while his second movie was The Attacks of 26/11, a film based on the 2008 Mumbai attacks, in which he played lead role of Mohammed Ajmal Amir Kasab, with Nana Patekar and Sadh Orhan.

He is  working in Devaki (2019 film) (initially titled Howrah Bridge)  directed by award-winning director Lohith H., a bilingual film in Kannada and Tamil being released in 2019.

Education and Life
Jaiswal was born on 18 February 1988 to Hindu parents in Jamshedpur, Jharkhand, India.  His father is a businessman from Jamshedpur and his mother is a housewife. He has one elder brother and two younger brothers. Jaiswal grew up in Jamshedpur where he attended Motilal Nehru Public School, then through IGNOU, he earned his bachelor's degree in arts. Jaiswal was also doing theater in Delhi while pursuing a graduation degree.

Career
Early in his career, he was recognized for his theatre acting in Delhi. He has done theatre in Delhi from 2005 to 2008. He was also selected as one of the ten finalists in the Delhi audition of Zee TV's India's Best Cinestars Ki Khoj in 2008. He then moved to Mumbai in 2008 and there he played a small role in one ad of the 2008 Indian Premier League. After that, he had many small roles in serials. In 2012, he played the role of assistant director in a TV serial Sasural Genda Phool. He also gave voice over in an animation film based on Mahabharat.

In 2013, Jaiswal got the opportunity to play lead role in the RGV-directed movie The Attacks Of 26/11. After auditioning 500 applicants, RGV finally found an actor Sanjeev Jaiswal to play Ajmal Kasab, the prime accused terrorist in the 26/11 attack on Mumbai. The movie released on 1 March and the acting of Jaiswal was appreciated by audience and media both. In a press conference, Jaiswal said his biggest challenge was that people shouldn't feel that he won the role just because he resembled the terrorist. Talking about the response to the film, Jaiswal said that people hated the character he played, but liked him as an actor.

Amitabh Bachchan said on Twitter, "RGV shows me a rough cut of his latest 'Attacks of 26/11' ... stunned, shocked, angered .. but choked with tears when  ..!" Nana Patekar is brilliant ... such restraint and maturity in his performance .. And the young actor Sanjeev Jaiswal that plays Kasab, so convincing. Director Shekhar Kapur tweeted saying, "Tonight is gonna b a tough night 2 sleep. Just came out of a screening of Ram Gopal Varma's film on 26/11". He went on to add, "Everyone will have a deeply personal reaction to Ram Gopal Varma's film on 26/11, but it left me haunted by the ghosts of those fateful days."

Ram Gopal Varma arranged a special screening of The Attacks of 26/11 for Senior BJP leader Lal Krishna Advani at the national capital. Advani was moved to tears in the climax of the film. Member of Parliament Rajeev Pratap Rudy said that he wants to arrange a show of 26/11 for all the MPs inside the parliament. Others present at the screening were Shah Nawaz Hussain, Sanjay Nirupam, Naveen Jindal Balbir Punj, and Raj Babbar. Directed by Ram Gopal Varma, The Attacks of 26/11 has received a similar response from most who have watched the film till now including Shekhar Kapur, Amitabh Bachchan and Abhishek Bachchan.

In 2022, Sanjeev also went to Jharkhand National Film Festival, Jamshedpur 2022 as a guest.

Filmography 

|2022
|Court Kachari
|Deepak
|Main Lead Hero

See also 
 List of people from Jamshedpur

References

External links
 
 

Indian male film actors
Male actors in Hindi cinema
Living people
People from Jamshedpur
1988 births
Male actors from Jharkhand